Line 2 of Luoyang Subway is the second metro line to open in Luoyang, Henan, China, which opened on 26 December 2021.

Opening timeline

Stations

References

Luoyang Subway lines
Railway lines opened in 2021
2021 establishments in China